Indira Allegra is a multidisciplinary American artist and writer based in Oakland, California.

Background and education 
Allegra was born in Detroit, Michigan, and moved to Portland, Oregon, in the 1980s. 
Allegra studied Biology at Yale University in the late 1990s but left and later completed an Associate of Applied Science degree in Sign Language Interpretation from Portland Community College in 2005 and a Bachelor of Fine Arts degree from the California College of Arts in 2015.
Allegra has worked as a sign language interpreter, domestic violence advocate, union organizer, teaching artist, and in the service industry.

Art and awards 
Allegra makes work concerned with memorial and social tension. They work in a variety of genres and media, including performative craft, poetry, dance, weaving, sculpture, assemblage, and site-specific installations. Their work has been featured in exhibitions at the Museum of Arts and Design, The University of Chicago's Arts Incubator, John Michael Kohler Arts Center, Yerba Buena Center for the Arts, Mills College Art Museum, Museum of the African Diaspora, and SOMArts. They have been awarded the United States Artists Award (2022), YBCA 100 Honoree (2020), Minnesota Street Project's California Black Voices Project Grant (2020), the Museum of Arts and Design's Burke Prize (2019). the Fleishhacker Foundation's Eureka Fellowship (2019), the Artadia Award (2018), the Mike Kelley Foundation Artist Project Grant (2018), 
the MAP Fund (2018), the Tosa Studio Award (2018), 
the Windgate Craft Fellowship (2015),
and the San Francisco Foundation's Joseph Henry Jackson Literary Award (2014).

Selected exhibitions 
  2022 TEXERE: The Shape of Loss is A Tapestry, Minnesota Street Project, San Francisco, California
  2019 Burke Prize Exhibition, Museum of Arts and Design, New York, New York
  2019 Even Thread [has] a Speech, John Michael Kohler Arts Center, Sheboygan, Wisconsin

 2018 Art+Practice+Ideas, Mills College Art Museum, Oakland, California
 2018 BODYWARP, Museum of the African Diaspora, San Francisco, California
 2016 Blackout, YBCA, San Francisco, California

Writing
Allegra published Blackout with Sming Sming Books in 2017. Their writing has appeared in American Craft, Art Journal, Foglifter Magazine, Cream City Review and Wordgathering: A Journal of Disability Poetry. Their work has been anthologized in Dear Sister, Red Indian Road West: Native American Poetry from California and Sovereign Erotics: A Collection of Two-Spirit Literature among others.

References

External links

Grammar of Grief Handbook
TEXERE

California College of the Arts alumni
Portland Community College alumni
Artists from Oakland, California
Native American artists
Writers from Oakland, California
African-American writers
Native American writers
Living people
Queer artists
Non-binary artists
21st-century American artists
1980 births
Artists from Detroit
American conceptual artists
21st-century African-American artists
20th-century African-American people